The Fundación Proa is a private art center in La Boca, Buenos Aires, Argentina. It was founded in 1996 and develops educational programs and exchange with cultural institutions. His focus is on the dissemination of the great artistic movements of the twentieth century.

The foundation is located at Pedro de Mendoza Avenue, 1929.

New headquarters

Ten years after its opening, Fundación Proa faced a renewal process that concluded in 2008 with the opening of its new headquarters. It is an old building Italianate facade and three floors with four exhibition halls, a multimedia auditorium, a specialized library, a restaurant and terrace, plus spaces for action and opening to the public and a transparent facade to communicate experiences from inside to the neighborhood. The project and direction of works is the Caruso-Torricella Milan studio, the same as in 1996 transformed the old building into an iconic landmark for contemporary art in Buenos Aires.

In the remodeling project, on both sides of the historic and restored front of the house that originally hosted the Fundación Proa in La Boca, two facades of glass incorporated contemporary style, both technologically and visually.

Principal exhibitions
Louise Bourgeois (2011)
Ron Mueck (2013)
Kazimir Malevich (2016)
 Yves Klein (2017)
Ai Weiwei (2017)
Alexander Calder (2018)
Anish Kapoor (2019)

References

External links
Official site

Museums in Buenos Aires
Art museums and galleries in Argentina
Art museums established in 1996
1996 establishments in Argentina